Personnel Specialist (abbreviated as PS) is a  United States Navy occupational rating.

Roles
Personnel Specialists:
Were established as a merger of Personnelman (PN) and Disbursing Clerk (DK) ratings on October 1, 2005
Perform clerical and administration duties involved in maintaining personnel records, preparing reports and accomplishing accounting procedures
 Counsel enlisted personnel concerning Navy ratings, training, advancement, awards, educational opportunities, and the rights, benefits and advantages of a Navy career
 Utilize and maintain current publications and directives pertaining to personnel administration and operate associated ADP equipment

References

See also
List of United States Navy ratings

United States Navy ratings